Christian Kuntz (born April 13, 1994) is an American football long snapper for the Pittsburgh Steelers of the National Football League (NFL). He played college football at Duquesne.

High school career
Kuntz is the son of Kathy and Theo Kuntz and he has two brothers, Jimmy and Louis. He attended Chartiers Valley High School in Pennsylvania, where he played basketball and football. Kuntz suffered a ruptured spleen prior to his senior season of football, forcing him to miss the season. On the basketball court, he won a WPIAL title alongside future NBA player and friend T. J. McConnell.

College career
Kuntz played linebacker at Duquesne. During his sophomore season, he tore his ACL. As a junior, he had 26 tackles for loss, 10 sacks, six pass breakups and four interceptions. Kuntz recorded 24 tackles for loss and 11.5 sacks in his senior season. He finished his collegiate career with a school-record 30.5 sacks and his 71.5 career tackles for loss rank sixth all-time on the FCS list. Kuntz was named a second-team Associated Press All-American in 2015 and 2016, and he was a two-time Northeast Conference Defensive Player of the Year honoree. Kuntz finished 12th in the voting for the 2016 Buck Buchanan Award.

Professional career

New England Patriots
After going undrafted in 2017, Kuntz was signed by the New England Patriots on August 28, 2017. He was waived the following day. After his experience with the Patriots, Kuntz decided to focus more on being a long snapper.

Denver Broncos
Kuntz was signed by the Denver Broncos on March 21, 2018. He was waived on June 14.

Jacksonville Jaguars
The Jacksonville Jaguars signed him to their practice squad on December 17. Kuntz signed a futures contract with the Jaguars on December 31. He was waived on June 13, 2019.

Pittsburgh Steelers
Kuntz was signed by the Pittsburgh Steelers on August 15, 2019. He played in the preseason finale against the Carolina Panthers and had five tackles and a sack. Kuntz was waived during final roster cuts on August 31.

Dallas Renegades
His performance in the preseason drew the attention of former Dallas Cowboys fullback Daryl Johnston, the director of player personnel of the Dallas Renegades of the XFL. Johnston was impressed by Kuntz's abilities as a long snapper and he suggested to assistant coach Kenny Perry that they sign him as a long snapper. Even though the Renegades already had a long snapper, Kuntz got the job due to his superior coverage abilities. Five games into the season, the XFL season was canceled due to the coronavirus pandemic. He had his contract terminated when the league suspended operations on April 10, 2020.

Pittsburgh Steelers (second stint)
Kuntz was signed by the Pittsburgh Steelers on March 30, 2020. He was waived on August 2. 

Kuntz had a tryout with the Houston Texans on August 20, 2020, and with the Indianapolis Colts on August 23. On November 24, the Steelers signed Kuntz to their practice squad. He was released on December 23, 2020, and re-signed to the practice squad on December 29, 2020. He was again released on January 6, 2021. On January 14, 2021, Kuntz signed a reserve/futures contract with the Steelers. 

On February 22, 2023, Kuntz re-signed with the Pittsburgh Steelers on a one-year contract.

References

External links
Duquesne Dukes bio
NFL.com profile
Twitter

Living people
1994 births
American football long snappers
Pittsburgh Steelers players
Dallas Renegades players
Duquesne Dukes football players
Sportspeople from the Pittsburgh metropolitan area
Players of American football from Pennsylvania